J.G. Schelter & Giesecke was a German type foundry and manufacturer of printing presses started 1819 in Leipzig by punchcutter Johann Schelter and typefounder Christian Friedrich Giesecke (1793-1850). The foundry was nationalized in 1946 by the new German Democratic Republic, forming VEB Typoart, Dresden.

Typefaces

These foundry types were produced by Schelter & Giesecke:

Typefaces

The foundry claimed by the twentieth century to have been one of the first to offer general-purpose sans-serif typefaces with lower-case, as early as 1825. This was repeated by some authors, but is now known to be untrue: Wolfgang Homola dates it to 1882 based on a study of Schelter & Giesecke specimens.

Press Manufacturing

Beginning in 1827 Schelter & Giesecke manufactured letterpress presses, cylinder proof presses and platen presses; and after World War I also of web-fed, letterpress and flexo printing presses.

The Leipzig house of foundry co-owner Georg Giesecke, designed by Berlin architect Max Hasak, survives and is listed.

References

Letterpress font foundries of Germany
Manufacturing companies established in 1819
Manufacturing companies based in Leipzig